Albert Crop Hawkins (1893–1950) was an English footballer who played for Stoke.

Career
Hawkins was born in Stoke-upon-Trent and played amateur football with Stoke St Peter's before joining Stoke in 1912. He spent two seasons at Stoke making a modest four appearances. He then returned to amateur football with Stoke United.

Career statistics

References

English footballers
Stoke City F.C. players
1893 births
1950 deaths
Association football midfielders